Mitrella rosadoi is a species of sea snail in the family Columbellidae, the dove snails.

References

rosadoi
Gastropods described in 1998